Syahril Sabirin (born 14 October 1943 in Bukittinggi, West Sumatra) served as governor of Indonesia's central bank from 1998 to 2003. In 2009, he was sentenced to two years in jail for his role in the Bank Bali scandal.

Education
Syahril studied at Gadjah Mada University in Yogyakarta, graduating with an economics degree from the Faculty of Economics in 1968. In 1972, he earned a scholarship from USAID to study at Williams College and graduated with Master of Arts in Development Economics in 1973. Under the USAID scholarship, he then continued to study at Vanderbilt University, earning a PhD in economics in 1979.

Career
Syahril joined Bank Indonesia in 1969. He later served a three-year term as Senior Financial Economist at the World Bank, Washington DC. In late 1997, Indonesian President Suharto summoned him back to Bank Indonesia, at which time the country was suffering from the Asian financial crisis. In February 1998, at the height of the economic and financial crisis, he was appointed Governor of Bank Indonesia, succeeding Soedradjad Djiwandono. Syahril oversaw the central bank's efforts to deal with the crisis under President Suharto until May 1998 and then under presidents BJ Habibie and Abdurrahman Wahid. He also oversaw the transformation of Bank Indonesia to an independent central bank in May 1999. He completed his term as Governor in May 2003.

Legal case
In 2000, Syahril had a dispute with President Wahid over banking issues, but as Bank Indonesia had become an independent central bank, the president did not have the legal authority to remove the central bank governor. The Attorney General then accused Syahril of involvement in the Bank Bali fraud scandal. In March 2002, Central Jakarta District Court sentenced him to three years' imprisonment, but he remained free pending an appeal and retained his position as central bank governor. In August 2002, Jakarta High Court overturned the conviction. The Supreme Court in 2004 upheld his acquittal. Then in 2009, in a controversial procedure, the Supreme Court re-examined the case and sentenced Syahril to two years' imprisonment.

References

External links
Profil di TokohIndonesia

1943 births
Living people
Minangkabau people
Indonesian businesspeople
Gadjah Mada University alumni
Vanderbilt University alumni
People from Bukittinggi
Indonesian economists
Governors of Bank Indonesia